All You Need Is Love is the debut mini album by Thai singer-songwriter and the winner of True Visions' Academy Fantasia season 4, Nat Sakdatorn, as a solo artist. The official release date of this album is April 25, 2008. The album contains a special CD+VCD package (6 tracks and 6 karaoke videos).

Production and songs
Sakdatorn revealed in คืนนี้ วันนั้น (on channel 5, aired on March 25, 2008) and Click Club (on True Inside, aired on March 30, 2008) that his debut album will contain 6 songs. The album is produced by Chestha Yarosake. The first single, รักได้อีก (Rak-Dai-Eek, meaning "I Can Love You More"), is an upbeat pop song with a funky disco arrangement. The song is written and composed by Yarosake (except for the English rap part, which is written by Sakdatorn himself) and is arranged by Banana Boat. Overall, this album has a pop feel mixed with Soul/R&B.

Faixas

External links 
 True Life: Nat – All You Need Is Love 
 True Life: Talk about All You Need Is Love 
 True Life: 4 albums from AF4 press release 

2008 EPs
Nat Sakdatorn albums